Direct Blue 15 is an organic compound that is classified as an azo dye.  It is a dark blue water soluble solid.  It is a popular substantive dye, which means that it useful for dying cotton and related cellulosic materials.  It is produced by azo coupling of o-dianisidine with the appropriate naphthalene disulfonate.

References

Azo dyes
Naphthalenesulfonic acids
1-Naphthols
Naphthylamines